Athisayangalude Venal (English: The Summer of Miracles) is a 2017 Indian Malayalam-language drama film directed by Prasanth Vijay. It is produced by Nikhil Narendran under the banner of Iceskating in Tropics and has Chandra Kiran GK, Reina Maria and Arya Manikandan in the lead roles. Chandra Kiran won a Special Jury Mention for his acting at the 48th Kerala State Film Awards and was declared the Best Actor of the 2018 Singapore South Asian International Film Festival. The film won the best debut award at the 2018 UK Asian Film Festival. In 2019, the film also featured in the list of 'The Best 200 Indian Films of the Decade' by Rediff.com.

The film is about a nine-year-old boy's obsession to become invisible, his relentless efforts to achieve that, and the consequences of his actions on people around him.

Cast 
Chandra Kiran GK as Anand
Reina Maria as Meera
Arya Manikandan as Gayathri
Jeet Minifence as Balakrishnan
Richin Thomas as Aravind
Rajeev Ramakrishnan as Ajaya Ghosh
Printo as Madhu

Reception

Critical response 
Namrata Joshi noted in The Hindu that "the budget is negligible and the narrative minimalist while the emotional arc remains strong". Shriram Iyengar of Cinestaan.com found it "surprisingly entertaining, funny, and unique in its story". Cinestaan.com also included the film in its year-end list of '10 festival gems' of 2017. Archana Nathan, writing for Scroll.in, noted that the film "beautifully moves between imagination and reality, science and faith, and knowledge and ignorance in its quest to understand the effects of the absence of a loved one". Rasmi Binoy of The Hindu observed that the film is "a sharp detour from recurrent tropes of ‘child-centric’ cinema" further writing: "The simple, sincere narrative is essentially about how people deal with grief and tragedy, by escaping to their own fantasy worlds". In his review in Asianculturevulture.com, Sailesh Ram wrote: "intelligent and questioning, this is a film for those who like something different and unpredictable and a film that is reflectively cerebral". Aseem Chhabra picked the film among the finest 200 Indian films in the 2010-2019 decade for Rediff.com.

Awards 
 Best debut film - UK Asian Film Festival, London
 Best actor - Singapore South Asian International Film Festival: Chandra Kiran GK
 Kerala State Film Award – Special Mention : Chandra Kiran GK

References

External links 

Athisayangalude Venal on Malayalam Movie & Music DataBase

2017 films
2017 drama films
2017_directorial_debut_films
Indian drama films
2010s Malayalam-language films